The Richmond was an electoral district for the Legislative Assembly in the Australian state of New South Wales from 1880 to 1913 in the Northern Rivers region and named after the Richmond River. It elected two members simultaneously between 1885 and 1889 and three members between 1889 and 1894, with voters casting a vote for each vacancy and the leading candidates being elected. In 1894, Lismore and Ballina were established and Richmond became a single-member electorate. Lismore was abolished in 1904 and recreated in 1913, replacing Richmond. Recently it has increasingly became more leftist with high amounts of urbanization.

Members for The Richmond

Election results

References

Former electoral districts of New South Wales
Constituencies established in 1880
1880 establishments in Australia
Constituencies disestablished in 1913
1913 disestablishments in Australia